Battle of Vardanakert was fought between an Arab garrison and Armenians. The Armenian prince Smbat VI Bagratuni defeated the 5,000-strong Umayyad army from the garrison in Nakhichevan. Struck by a surprise attack, the remaining Arabs fled to the river Araxes and either drowned or froze to death. Smbat, chosen to rule by Byzantine commission, managed to re-conquer the majority of Armenia and drive the Arabs out of the country.

Despite this success, the Umayyad generals Muhammad ibn Marwan and Maslamah ibn Abd al-Malik soon restored Armenia to subject status.   Muslim control was secured by organizing a large-scale massacre of the princely families (nakharar) within the cathedral of Nakhchivan, which was burned, in 704.

Notes

References

Sources

702
Varnakert
Varnakert
Varnakert
700s in the Umayyad Caliphate